Pinoy Boyband Superstar is a Philippine reality singing competition shown on ABS-CBN. The show is hosted by Billy Crawford. The judges of the show are composed of Aga Muhlach, Yeng Constantino, Sandara Park and Vice Ganda. The show premiered on September 10, 2016, replacing the third season of The Voice Kids. The goal of the show is to find the members for the newest "Pinoy boyband" (all-male Filipino pop group).

The 5-member Pinoy Boyband would win a talent management contract from Star Magic, a recording contract from Star Music, 5 units of Yamaha Mio motorcycles and a total cash prize of ₱5,000,000 tax free from Yamaha and ABS-CBN.

Niel Murillo, Russell Reyes, Ford Valencia, Tristan Ramirez and Joao Constancia are the members of the first Pinoy Boyband called BoybandPH. They performed their first single, "We Made It", at the end of the show.

The show ended on December 11, 2016, and was replaced by Kapamilya Weekend Specials and the first season of Your Face Sounds Familiar Kids.

Overview
Pinoy Band Superstar is based on the Latin-American singing competition series La Banda created by Simon Cowell and shown on Univision. According to ABS-CBN: "the reality show aims to find new Pinoy boy bands that will bring romance and good music to television viewers."

Format
The audience will have a big part in choosing the boy bands. According to the host, performers will have to go through the all-female audience first and have at least 75% of them for approval before performing in front of the judges. Crawford also acknowledged that it would not be easy to look for new boy bands. He stated: "...it's not all about the looks -- it's about the charm, about the performance. [Judges would also have] special technical aspects [in order for them] to save a performer from the audience..."

Development
On August 6, ABS-CBN uploaded a video teaser of Pinoy Boyband Superstar on YouTube. With the introduction of La Banda, the video reiterates the show's mechanics. A week later, video teasers of the four judges were shown on television one-by-one: Vice Ganda was shown first, followed by Sandara Park, and Yeng Constantino. The fourth judge was revealed to be Aga Muhlach, who made a comeback in ABS-CBN. A few days before the premiere, a trailer showing Simon Cowell promoting the show was released.

Host

After signing his new contract with ABS-CBN, Billy Crawford was announced to host the talent show on August 16. As one of the in-demand hosts of the Philippine television today, he is set to host this show together with other television talent shows, including the Kids edition of Your Face Sounds Familiar, and the Philippine edition of Dancing With The Stars. Upon announcing his new stint, he said: "This is a new franchise and this is going to be wonderful and going to be exciting."

Judges
During the trade launch on June 28, Vice Ganda, Yeng Constantino, Aga Mulach and Sandara Park were announced to be judges for the then-upcoming talent show Pinoy Band Superstar. During this time, auditions were already ongoing. Since Park is living in South Korea, producers of the show went to the office of YG Entertainment, Park's agency, to do her video promo and photo shoot. On June 27, Star Cinema's AdProm director tweeted: "Sandara will be back!" and "Vice, Yeng and Sandara as judges!" with the hashtag #pinoyboybandsuperstar on both tweets, confirming Park's addition in the show. Star Cinema's Mico del Rosario also uploaded a short greeting of Park on Instagram as a teaser for the show. In the video, Park said, :"This is going to be exciting. See you, Kapamilya. Mahal ko kayo! (I love you all!)". Although she was occasionally seen guesting in some Philippine shows, this would be her regular television comeback after leaving for South Korea in 2007. She stated: "It is good to experience various things in various areas. I think those experiences will be a big help for me later. Philippines is a special place since I grew up here and people sent much love here."

The time Crawford was announced to host, he revealed the next judge will be formally announced on Thursday. According to him, the audience would be surprised as to who would be the next judge. Following Crawford's revelation, the fourth judge was announced to be actor Aga Muhlach two days later. He was reported to lose weight because he did not want to look like a father while being with the other judges.

Auditions

The open auditions for boys, 14 to 25 years old and can sing and groove were held in the following locations:

The online and social network auditions were also announced which ran from July 27 to August 10, 2016.

Other content
Pinoy Boyband Superstar: Online airs their episodes on the official website and on their official YouTube channel hosted by IA and AI dela Cruz.

Contestants

Color key

Judges' Audition
From the different parts of the Philippines: Luzon, Visayas and Mindanao. Even from the different parts of the world: Asia, America and Europe. The journey for the boyband dream starts here. This is the first step before their auditions. They need to focus, to vocalize, to get rid of their tension because they will face the 500 girls. The girls will decide whether the contestant can enter the booth to audition for the judges. Each contestant needs to impress the girls through dancing, pick up lines and so on except singing. If they get 74% votes downward, the judges can override the girls' votes or may be it is the end of their journey but when they get 75% votes upward, they will proceed to the judges' booth and face the 4 superstar judges. In front of the judges, the contestant will perform his prepared song. He must get 3 or more yeses from the judges to pass to the next round.

Color key

Episode 1 (September 10)

Episode 2 (September 11)

Episode 3 (September 17)

Episode 4 (September 18)

Episode 5 (September 24)

Episode 6 (September 25)

Episode 7 (October 1)

Episode 8 (October 2)

Episode 9 (October 8)

Episode 10 (October 9)

Episode 11 (October 15)

Episode 12 (October 16)

Middle Rounds

From 40 contestants who passed the auditions, the judges will choose the top 20 boys with their best combination of charm, personality and knowledge of singing. They will group the top 20 boys into 4 boybands with 5 members each. But there is also a 5th boyband. And this last boyband will come from 5 members of bottom 20 boys. 5 boybands will perform in front of the judges and the girls wherein they will choose who will be in the top 12 that will perform in the "Live Shows."

Judges' Deliberation
The judges unanimously decided who are going to be part of the top 20 except for a few contestants.

Some of the contestants were given an assignment by the judges and it is to study the Filipino language to sing the OPM songs which is important in a Pinoy boyband. So during the deliberations, the judges decided to determine the results of the challenge provided to them.

James Ryan Cesena, Sef Hynard and Russell Reyes were requested by the judges to perform on stage and sing an OPM song.

After the judges heard the Tagalog performances of Russell, James and Sef, the top 20 boys were completed.

At the end of the deliberation, the judges formed from top 20 boys into 4 groups with 5 members each who are to sing in the Middle Rounds' Performance Night. The groups will perform in ballad, acoustic, pop and R&B genres. While the 5th group will be the chosen 5 of bottom 20 who will also perform the upbeat genre.

Announcement
Color key

The top 20 grouped into 4 of 5 contestants who will perform on the "Middle Rounds' Performance Night."

Last Chance Performance Night
The judges divide the remaining 20 into 2 groups and each group is required to perform a boyband hit. They give 24 hours to rehearse the song. This is the last chance to perform in front of the judges and the girls. But still the judges will select the 5th group.

Color key

The contestants of the 5th group who will perform on the "Middle Rounds' Performance Night."

Performance Night
5 groups with 5 members each will perform. Each group will perform a boyband hit assigned to them: a ballad, a pop song, acoustic, upbeat and of course R&B. They will perform as a group but each contestant will be judged individually. In this round, they will perform with their group mates. At the same time, they will use their charm, personality and talent. From 25 contestants, the top 12 will advance to the next round: 3 boys from the girl fans' votes while 9 boys will be chosen by the judges.

Color key

The top 3 contestants voted by the girl fans.

Live Shows

They will perform as a group. They will succeed as a group. And if they are careless, they will fail as a group. This is the test for the boys to perform in different groups. A young heartthrob will be eliminated every week until seven are left in the grand finals. And from the seven, five will be chosen to form the first superstar boyband of the country.

The superstar judges select the strongest and the weakest group. The strongest group will be declared as the boyband of the week. While the members of the weakest group would have to individually sing their survival songs.  Aside from the talent, the young heartthrobs will be judge in their overall character and performance onstage.

One or two will be saved by the votes of the viewing public. One will be saved by the superstar judges. In case of a tie, the next highest number of public votes will be saved. And the remaining contestant will be eliminated from the competition.

Color key

Week 1: Top 12 (November 5 and 6)

Group Performances

The top 12 cast lots to determine who will form the 4 groups with 3 members each.

Individual Performances

Non-Competition Performance

Week 2: Top 11 (November 12 and 13)

Group Performances

The boys were divided into three groups: two 4-member and one 3-member groups and their challenge is to sing the OPM hits.

Individual Performances

Two contestants with the highest number of public votes will be saved.

Non-Competition Performance

Week 3: Top 10 (November 19 and 20)

Group Performances

Individual Performances

Non-Competition Performance

Week 4: Top 9 (November 26 and 27)

Group Performances

Individual Performances

Non-Competition Performance

Week 5: Top 8 (December 3 and 4)

Sudden Death Challenge

Individual Performances

Two contestants with the highest number of public votes will be saved.

Non-Competition Performance

The Grand Reveal

They will perform in 3 groups consists of 2 duos and 1 trio. Seven remaining heartthrobs are left in the grand finals to prove to the judges and the public that they deserve a spot on the Superstar Boyband. And from the seven, five boyband aspirants will be chosen to form the first superstar boyband of the country will be named as "BoybandPH".

The superstar judges will give individual scores based on the performances of the grand finalists, it will be combined to make the half of the criteria completed. The other half of the criteria is done by public voting thru text and google votes.

One grand finalists will be named Saturday night as part of the Superstar Boyband, and four other members will be named Sunday night. And the remaining 2 grand finalists will not be mentioned will be eliminated from the competition and occasionally didn't make it to the Boyband.

Color key

Finals Week: Top 7 (December 10)

Group Performances

The top 7 formed in 3 groups consists of 2 duos and 1 trio. This will not be judge as a group overall to pick the weakest and strongest group. Each grand finalists will be scored individually.

Niel Murillo garnered a total of 98.63% of the combined judges scores and public votes declaring him the first member of BoybandPH.

Non-competition Performance

Finals Week: Top 6 (December 11)

Individual Performances

The top 6 remaining grand finalists will prove once again to the judges and the public for the very last time that they deserved to be a member of the BoybandPH. On the other hand, the voting percentages are all revert to zero. The 6 remaining grand finalists will battle it out for the last 4 coveted spots to make it to the Superstar Boyband.

Russell Reyes, Ford Valencia, Tristan Ramirez and Joao Constancia announced as the other 4 members of the Superstar Boyband. They emerged as the winners of the competition aside Niel Murillo to form the Superstar Boyband called "BoybandPH".

Non-competition Performance

Winning Performance

BoybandPH release their first single entitled "We Made It" written by Kiko Salazar and is yet to be released digitally later this year and its produced by Star Music.

Elimination Chart

Color key

Note: (*) Niel Murillo enters the first cut to make on the Superstar Pinoy Boyband by receiving the highest percentage of combined judges scores and public votes. Regardless, all scores of the 6 grand finalists are revert to zero, the remaining grand finalists battle for the last 4 coveted slots to make it to the Superstar Boyband namely "BoybandPH".

Contestants who appeared on previous shows
 Allen Cecilio and Mark Oblea were on the Spogify feat. Singing Baes segment of Eat Bulaga! and were eliminated during the daily round.
 Markus Paterson appeared on ASAP and as an occasional guest on ASAP Chillout.
 Ethan Salvador was one of the current Star Magic Artist and also he's a current co-host of "Swak Na Swak". 
 Miggy Campbell was a supporting cast on You're My Home. He also appeared on the music video of "Pare, Mahal Mo Raw Ako", as well as the movie version of the same name.
 Jayvee Mendoza and Bjorn Mendoza were featured on the Ano Ka Hello? singing battle segment of Kapuso Mo, Jessica Soho.
 Kokoy de Santos is a TV commercial actor and a former co-host in Walang Tulugan with the Master Showman. He was cast in various drama series (Futbolilits, Makapiling Kang Muli, Kidlat, My Husband's Lover, Oh My G!, #ParangNormal Activity) and films (Bromance: My Brother's Romance, Kimmy Dora: Ang Kiyemeng Prequel, Kid Kulafu, Kip Oebanda, Tumbang Preso). He also starred in numerous Maalaala Mo Kaya episodes including "Kamao", "Bimpo", "Family Picture", "Red Envelope", "Korona", "Sketch Pad", "Lubid", "Puno", "Picture", and "Hijab".
 Wilbert Rosalyn joined the Tawag ng Tanghalan segment of It's Showtime though he was eliminated during the daily round.
 Julijo Pisk was a contestant of ABS-CBN's Star Circle Summer Kid Quest and was named as the 2nd runner-up.
 Luigi D'Avola was a contestant of Myx VJ Search in MYX back in 2014 and was named as one of the winners of the show.
 Joao Constancia appeared in The Ryzza Mae Show as a contestant in Picture o Tanong? segment and in Eat Bulaga! as part of the audience.

Reception

Television Ratings
Television ratings for the Pinoy Boyband Superstar on ABS-CBN were gathered from two major sources, namely from AGB Nielsen and Kantar Media. AGB Nielsen's survey ratings were gathered from Mega Manila households; it is worth noting that since July 2016, AGB Nielsen expanded their coverage to include urban Luzon. On the other hand, Kantar Media's survey ratings were gathered from urban and rural households all over the Philippines.

Notes

References

External links
Pinoy Boyband Superstar on ABS-CBN

ABS-CBN original programming
Philippine reality television series
2016 Philippine television series debuts
2016 Philippine television series endings
Philippine television series based on American television series
Television series by Fremantle (company)
Filipino-language television shows